Helps is an unincorporated community in Menominee County, in the U.S. state of Michigan.

History
The community was named for Arthur Helps, an English writer.

References

Unincorporated communities in Menominee County, Michigan